Rabindranath Bhattacharjee is an Indian politician. He is also an MLA, elected from the Singur constituency in the 2011 West Bengal state assembly election. Bhattacharjee better known as “Mastermoshai” which means teacher.

Political career 

In 2001, Bhattacharjee won the Singur constituency as All India Trinamool Congress. He was instrumental in mobilizing land acquisition of a proposed Tata Nano factory in Singur. This was one of the causes which led to the defeat of the longest-serving democratically elected Communist government in the world, ending the 34-year rule of the Left Front government, a fact that was noted by the international media.
From May 2011 to November 2012, he was Minister for Agriculture in Mamata Banerjee ministry and was Minister for Statistics & Programme Implementation November 2012 to May 2016. 
In 2021 elections, All India Trinamool Congress denied a ticket for Bhattacharjee. He joined Bharatiya Janata Party and became the candidate from Singur.

References 

1932 births
Living people
West Bengal MLAs 2001–2006
West Bengal MLAs 2006–2011
West Bengal MLAs 2011–2016
West Bengal MLAs 2016–2021
State cabinet ministers of West Bengal
Bharatiya Janata Party politicians from West Bengal
Former members of Trinamool Congress
People from Singur